Bercea may refer to:

 Bercea, Sălaj County, a village in Sălaj County, Romania
 Marius Bercea, Romanian contemporary artist
 Virgil Bercea, Romanian Greek-Catholic bishop